Julia Pereira is a Brazilian model.  She began modeling at the age of 16.  Her first big break was a cover shoot for Italy's Posh magazine in 2005.  Pereira had worked in Milan, Barcelona, and Paris before transitioning to work mostly in New York and Miami.

See also
List of Brazilians

References

Brazilian female models
Living people
Year of birth missing (living people)